These lists of Australian cities by population provide rankings of Australian cities and towns according to various systems defined by the Australian Bureau of Statistics.

The eight Greater Capital City Statistical Areas are listed for the state and territory capital cities. All Significant Urban Areas (SUA), representing urban agglomerations of over 10,000 population, are listed next. The fifty largest Urban Centres (built-up area) are then ranked and, lastly, the fifty largest Local Government Areas (the units of local government below the states and territories) are also ranked.

Greater capital city statistical areas by population
Each capital city forms its own Greater Capital City Statistical Area (GCCSA), which according to the Australian Bureau of Statistics (ABS) represents a broad functional definition of each of the eight state and territory capital cities. In Australia, the population of the GCCSA is the most-often quoted figure for the population of capital cities. These units correspond broadly to the international concept of metropolitan areas.

Notes

Significant urban areas by population
The following table ranks the SUAs, including those of the capital cities (which are smaller than their respective GCCSAs, except for Canberra's, which includes adjacent Queanbeyan, in New South Wales). Capitals are in bold. Significant Urban Areas are defined to represent significant towns and cities, or agglomerations of smaller towns, that have at least 10,000 total population. Significant Urban Areas may contain more than one distinct Urban Centre.

70% of the Australian population live in the top eight most populous cities (images below).

50 largest urban centres by population
Urban centres are defined by the Australian Bureau of Statistics as being a population cluster of 1,000 or more people. For statistical purposes, people living in urban centres are classified as urban. The figures below represent the populations of the contiguous built-up areas of each city; with state and territory capitals in bold. These figures are only updated every census, as the ABS does not render population projections for Urban Centres, and as such can only be as up-to-date as the most recent census year.

List of local government areas by population
Local government areas (LGAs) are the main units of local government in Australia. They may be termed cities, councils, regions, shires, towns, or other names, and all function similarly. Local government areas cover around 90 per cent of the nation. Significant sections of South Australia and New South Wales are unincorporated, that is, have no defined local government, along with the ACT and smaller sections of Northern Territory and Victoria. Brisbane is the only state capital city with its respective LGA (City of Brisbane) covering a significant portion of its urban area. Other capital cities have its central LGAs covering a much smaller proportion of their total urban areas.

The populations of the central local government areas in other capitals are relatively small. Most Australian capital cities have suburban local government areas significantly larger in population than the central local government area.

Definitions

Illustrated are the various statistical areas defined by the Australian Bureau of Statistics for Sydney and its surrounds. The extent of the Greater Sydney greater capital city statistical area is designated by thick grey line and black text. The greater capital city statistical areas are the eight unique statistical divisions delineating the broadest possible concept of each state or territory capital city, constructed from one or more whole labour market areas (designated SA4 in the Australian Statistical Geography Standard). The rest of NSW area includes the entire remainder of the state, as each state or territory has only one GCCSA.

The significant urban areas are designated by solid orange lines with stippled fill and red text. Significant urban areas are statistical divisions designed to represent significant towns and cities or associated collections of smaller towns, with total populations of 10,000 people or more. They consist of single, or clusters of, urban centres/localities (see below), and are constructed from one or more SA2 units, which are collations of suburbs and localities designed for consistent statistical output between censuses.

The Urban Centres/Localities are designated by dashed red lines with pink fill. Urban centres/localities are statistical divisions delineating the contiguous built up, or urban areas of cities, towns and most small settlements. They are constructed from the smallest statistical output areas (SA1).

Also represented are 31 outlined coloured areas. These are the 31 local government areas that are commonly understood as comprising Sydney, albeit unofficially.

See also
 Demography of Australia
 List of cities in Australia
 List of cities in Oceania by population
 List of largest cities in the world
 List of places in New South Wales by population
 List of places in Queensland by population
 List of places in South Australia by population
 List of places in Tasmania by population
 List of places in Victoria by population
 List of places in Western Australia by population
 List of towns and cities in Australia by year of settlement

References

External links
  — Spreadsheet of population data for local government areas in the 2006 and 2011 Australian census

 Population
Australia

Australia
Australia

hi:आस्ट्रेलिया के नगर
lt:Australijos miestai
sr:Списак градова у Аустралији